Reading Center is a hamlet in Schuyler County, New York, United States. Reading Center has a post office with ZIP code 14876, which opened on February 19, 1844.

References

Hamlets in Schuyler County, New York
Hamlets in New York (state)